Goetia is a point-and-click adventure video game developed by French studio Sushee and published by Square Enix Collective. It was released on April 14, 2016 for Microsoft Windows, OS X and Linux, and on April 26, 2018 for the Nintendo Switch. In it, the player takes the role of the ghost of a 12-year-old girl named Abigail Blackwood 40 years after she perished, searching for the truth behind her death and the abandonment of her village. The game received mixed to positive reviews, with critics praising its writing, graphics and mystery, but criticizing its high difficulty.

A sequel, Goetia 2, was released on May 19, 2022.

Reception 

Goetia received an aggregate score of 79/100 on Metacritic for the PC version. Courtney Ehrenhofler of Adventure Gamers rated it 5/5 stars, calling it "beautifully crafted and intricately complex", and the artwork "gorgeous", but criticizing the game's lack of a hint system. Dejan Stojilovic of PLAY! Magazine rated the game 8.5/10, praising the graphics and "excellent background music", but also remarking that the lack of hints made the game cruel to beginners, and may result in them quitting the game. David Soriano of IGN Spain rated the game 7.7/10, saying that it stands out for the quality of its writing, but criticizing its heavy difficulty, which requires the player to use pen and paper to take notes.

Jon Cousins of Nintendo Life rated the game's Switch version 7/10 stars, calling it "flawed, yet engrossing".

References 

2016 video games
Demons in popular culture
Horror video games
Indie video games
Kickstarter-funded video games
Linux games
MacOS games
Mystery video games
Nintendo Switch games
Point-and-click adventure games
Puzzle video games
Single-player video games
Square Enix games
Video games developed in France
Video games featuring female protagonists
Windows games
Works set in country houses